The Yorkshire Society of Textile Craftsmen (YSTC) was a trade union representing workers in a variety of textile work in Yorkshire.

History
The union was established in 1952, when the Bradford and District Association of Warp Dressers, the Halifax and District Association of Warpdressers and the Huddersfield and District Worsted and Woollen Warpers' Association merged with the Yorkshire Warp Twisters' Society.  The industry was already in decline and, by 1960, its membership was only 1,239.  The Bradford and Halifax Associations had both held membership of the General Union of Lancashire and Yorkshire Warpdressers Association, and the YSTC continued its affiliation until 1970, when the General Union was dissolved.

Mergers 
A series of further amalgamations took place, with the Textile Daymen and Cloth Pattern Makers' Association joining in 1968 and the Leeds and District Warp Dressers, Twisters and Kindred Trades Association joining in 1975.  Despite this, its membership fell to only 913 in 1978, and at the end of 1980, it merged into the National Union of Dyers, Bleachers and Textile Workers.

General Secretaries
1952: J. H. Norris
1958: C. Hall
1976: F. Towers

References

Defunct trade unions of the United Kingdom
Trade unions established in 1952
Trade unions disestablished in 1980
1952 establishments in the United Kingdom
Textile and clothing trade unions
Trade unions based in West Yorkshire